Peter von Bitter is an Emeritus Professor in the Department of Geology at the University of Toronto and he holds a post at the Royal Ontario Museum. His research has been wide-ranging but focused on conodonts. His most noted work was his examination of the well preserved fossil vent communities in Lower Carboniferous strata of western Newfoundland.

Professional affiliations 
 Fellow of the Geological Association of Canada,
 Pander society, Chief Panderer

References 

Canadian paleontologists
Conodont specialists
Living people
Year of birth missing (living people)